Giovanni De Gennaro (born August 14, 1948 in Reggio Calabria, Italy) is Chairman of the first Italian Defense Group Leonardo (formerly Finmeccanica). He was Italy's former police chief and Undersecretary to the Italian Prime Minister with responsibility for information services and security. He was appointed former chief of the Italian police department and director of the information services and security department.

Career
De Gennaro graduated in Law at Sapienza University of Rome, and then joined the Italian Police Department. Afterwards he was moved to Rome to join the narcotics unit. During his career he collaborated with Giovanni Falcone, carrying out international investigations against the Mafia. In 1984 he was the lead officer during the extradition issues of the informer Tommaso Buscetta from Brazil.

In 1994 he was appointed as Prefect and on 26 May 2000 as Chief of the Italian Police Department - Director General for Public Security. 
He is in charge of the Italian Police during the 2001 G8 summit in Genoa, including the raid on the Diaz school. For such deeds, Italy will later be condemned by the European Court of Human Rights in 2015 and 2017 for not having prevented and punished acts of torture by state agents. De Gennaro was prosecuted, condemned and later cleared by Cassation for inducing false testimonies.

In 2007 De Gennaro became Head of Cabinet for the Italian Ministry of Interior, and held the position of Special Commissioner for an emergency crisis related to waste in Campania region.

In June 2008 he became Director General of the Department of Security Information (DIS) and in 2012 he became Undersecretary to the Italian Prime Minister with responsibility for information services and security.

In July 2013 Giovanni De Gennaro was appointed as Chairman of Finmeccanica (today Leonardo) by the Board of Directors with duties regarding International Relations, Institutional Relations, External Relations and Communication, Group Security and Internal Audit.

In May 2014 Giovanni De Gennaro has been confirmed as Chairman by Finmeccanica Board of Directors and again in May 2017 when he was attributed the supervision of the execution of corporate governance rules related to integrity in corporate behaviours and fight to corruption.
Several politicians have opposed De Gennaro's chairmanship of Leonardo/Finmeccanica due to his past in Genoa, including the then-president of the Democratic Party Matteo Orfini, who deemed it "shameful", as well as other politicians from Movimento Cinque Stelle and Sinistra Ecologia Libertà.

Honors

References

1948 births
Italian businesspeople
Sapienza University of Rome alumni
Italian police officers
Government ministers of Italy
Living people